Elzéar-Henri Juchereau Duchesnay (July 19, 1809 – May 12, 1871) was a seigneur, lawyer and political figure in Canada East. He also served in the Senate of Canada from 1867 until his death.

Juchereau Duchesnay, also sometimes referred to as Henri-Elzéar, was born in Beauport, Lower Canada in 1809, the son of Antoine-Louis Juchereau Duchesnay. He studied law, was called to the bar in 1832 and settled at Sainte-Marie-de-la-Beauce. In 1838, on the death of his first wife, Julie Perrault, daughter of Jean-Baptiste-Olivier Perrault, he inherited part of the seigneury of Sainte-Marie. In 1846, he became lieutenant-colonel in the local militia. He was also interested in farming and was president of the county agricultural society. He was elected to the Legislative Council of the Province of Canada in 1856 for the Lauzon division and served until Confederation, when he was appointed to the Canadian Senate. He served as mayor for Sainte-Marie-de-la-Beauce from 1868 to 1870.

He died at Sainte-Marie-de-la-Beauce in 1871.

One of his sons, Charles-Edmond, became superintendent of the Canadian Pacific Railway in British Columbia. Another son Henri-Jules served in the House of Commons. He was the grandfather of François-Xavier Chouinard, clerck of the Ville de Québec until 1961.

References 
 
 
 

1809 births
1871 deaths
Canadian senators from Quebec
Conservative Party of Canada (1867–1942) senators
Members of the Legislative Council of the Province of Canada
People from Beauce, Quebec